Sabé Sports de Bouna is an Ivorian football club based in Bouna.

History
They club was a member of the Ivorian Football Federation Premiere Division and was 2010 relegated to the Championnat National de 2ème Division. They play at the Stade Municipal.

Current squad

Notes

Football clubs in Ivory Coast
Sports clubs in Ivory Coast
Sport in Zanzan District
Bounkani